Lake Dexter is a reservoir in the U.S. state of Wisconsin.

Lake Dexter was formed in 1965 when a dam on the Yellow River was completed. The lake takes its name from Dexter township. A variant name is "Dexter Lake".

References

Lakes of Wood County, Wisconsin
Lakes of Wisconsin